Daniel Ernesto Flores (born August 28, 1961) is an American prelate of the Roman Catholic Church. He has been the Bishop of Brownsville in Texas since December 2009. He served as an auxiliary bishop of the Archdiocese of Detroit in Michigan from 2006 to 2009.

Biography

Early life and education 
Daniel Flores was born on August 28, 1961, in Palacios, Texas, to Fernando and Lydia Flores, both of whom were born to "families long established around the town of Zapata, Texas, with roots on both sides of the border" between Mexico and the United States. He has two brothers, Billie and Javier, and one sister, Teresa. 

Shortly after Flores' birth, his family moved to Corpus Christi, Texas. He graduated from Flour Bluff High School in Corpus Christi in 1979, and then studied at the University of Texas at Austin for two years. In 1981, Flores entered Holy Trinity Seminary in Irving, Texas. He obtained a Bachelor of Philosophy degree (1983) and a Master of Divinity degree (1987) from the University of Dallas.

Priesthood 
Flores was ordained to the priesthood for the Diocese of Corpus Christi by Bishop René Gracida on January 30, 1988. He then served as parochial vicar at Corpus Christi Cathedral Parish. He was also private secretary and master of ceremonies to Gracida, vice-chancellor of the diocese, rector of the St. John Vianney House of Studies, and episcopal vicar for vocations (1992–1997). Flores was raised by the Vatican to the rank of chaplain to his holiness in September 1995.In 1997, Flores was sent to Rome by Bishop Roberto Nieves to further his studies. In 2000, Flores received a Doctor of Theology degree from Pontifical University of St. Thomas Aquinas.

Returning to Texas, Flores served as chancellor of the Diocese of Corpus Christi.  In August 2001, he was assigned to the Archdiocese of Galveston-Houston. He there served as professor of theology at the University of St. Thomas in Houston and formation director at St. Mary's Seminary in Houston, where he was also vice-rector (2002–2006).In September 2005, Flores became rector of Corpus Christi Cathedral Parish, assuming full duties in June 2006.

Auxiliary Bishop of Detroit 
On October 28, 2006, Flores was appointed as auxiliary bishop of the Archdiocese of Detroit and titular bishop of Cozyla by Pope Benedict XVI. He received his episcopal consecration on November 29 2006. from Cardinal Adam Maida, with Bishops Edmond Carmody and René Gracida serving as co-consecrators. His episcopal motto, taken from the Summa Theologica, is:  ("The Word Is Sent Breathing Forth Love").Flores became the youngest bishop in the United States and the first Latino bishop in the Archdiocese of Detroit.

Bishop of Brownsville
On December 9, 2009, Benedict XVI appointed Flores as the bishop of the Diocese of Brownsville succeeding Bishop Raymundo Peña. Flores was installed  on February 2, 2010.

On June 12, 2019, Flores addressed the United States Conference of Catholic Bishops (USCCB) regarding the policies of the Trump Administration towards undocumented immigrants on the US-Mexico border.“I feel that as a (bishops’) conference, we must express ourselves more strongly when it comes to the dignity of immigrants, to say that they are not criminals, that they are vulnerable families and we need to invite all the governments involved, not just the U.S., to defend the migrant as a human being, to not cast the person aside as someone who doesn’t matter and is a problem,”On November 16, 2020, Flores was elected to head the Committee on Doctrine of the USCCB.

See also 

 Catholic Church hierarchy
 Catholic Church in the United States
 Historical list of the Catholic bishops of the United States
 List of Catholic bishops of the United States
 Lists of patriarchs, archbishops, and bishops

References

External links

 

1961 births
Living people
University of Texas at Austin alumni
University of Dallas alumni
People from Palacios, Texas
American people of Mexican descent
21st-century Roman Catholic bishops in the United States
Pontifical University of Saint Thomas Aquinas alumni
Pontifical North American College alumni
Roman Catholic Archdiocese of Detroit
Religious leaders from Texas
Catholics from Texas
University of St. Thomas (Texas) faculty